You & Me is the second extended play by South Korean co-ed group KARD. It was released on November 21, 2017, by DSP Media and distributed by LOEN Entertainment. The EP consists of nine tracks, including the lead single "You in Me".

The EP debuted at number 8 on the Gaon Album Chart, at number 4 on the US World Albums and at number 17 on the US Heatseekers Albums. It has sold over 11,500 physical copies as of November 2017.

Background and release 
On November 6, 2017, the group released an image on their official Twitter account with the caption "2017.11.21 #COMINGUP". A day after, the same image was released, this time with the words "You & Me, You In Me" written on it.

On November 8, the full track list was revealed. The EP consists of a total of nine tracks, of which only six are available in its digital edition and nine in its physical edition. On November 11, teaser images of each member and the group were released. A day later, the album package was detailed. It consists of a booklet of 76 pages, two types of photocards, a group poster, and a track list sticker designed by member BM, only for pre-orders. On November 18, a highlight medley was released through the group's official YouTube channel, showing a preview of the main six tracks. They also uploaded various videos, showing the behind the scenes of the jacket photos and recording sessions.

The EP was released on November 21 through several music portals, including MelOn and iTunes.

Promotion

Singles 
"You in Me" was released as the lead single in conjunction with the EP on November 21, alongside the music video.

"Trust Me" was released as a promotional single. It was performed live on Music Bank on November 24, as part of their comeback stage. On December 6, the music video was released as a prequel film to the "You In Me" music video.

Live performances 
The group held a comeback showcase on the day of the album release. The group started promoting on music programs, with their first performance being on MBC Music's Show Champion on November 22. They continued on KBS's Music Bank on November 24, MBC's Show! Music Core on November 25 and SBS's Inkigayo on November 26.

Commercial performance 
You & Me debuted at number 8 on the Gaon Album Chart, on the chart issue dated November 19–25, 2017. It also debuted at number 4 on the US World Albums chart, and at number 17 on the US Heatseekers Albums chart, on the week ending December 9, 2017, achieving a new peak as a group in the lattest chart, after their debut EP peaked at number 25. The EP debuted at number 23 on the Gaon chart for the month of November 2017, with 11,515 physical copies sold.

Track listing

Charts

Release history

References 

2017 EPs
DSP Media albums
Kard (group) albums